Beauty Spot (French: Grains de beauté) is a 1932 French musical comedy film directed by Pierre Caron and Léonce Perret and starring Simone Cerdan, Marfa d'Hervilly and Doris Morrey. It is a remake of the 1931 German film Opera Ball and is part of the operetta film genre.

The film's sets were designed by Jacques Colombier.

Cast
 Simone Cerdan as Colette Dupont  
 Marfa d'Hervilly as Tante Aurélie  
 Doris Morrey as Pepita
 Christiane Tourneur as Lily
 Jeanne Fusier-Gir as Jacqueline  
 Roger Tréville as Jacques  
 Albert Duvaleix as Lucien Fortier
 Marcel Lutrand as André
 Marcel Lagrange as Durvy
 Henri Richard as L'ambassadeur
 André Roanne as Pierre Daumont 
 Netta Duchâteau
 Louis Florencie 
 Nono Lecorre
 George Rigaud

See also
 After the Ball (1932)

References

Bibliography 
 Crisp, Colin. Genre, Myth and Convention in the French Cinema, 1929-1939. Indiana University Press, 2002.

External links 
 

1932 films
1932 musical comedy films
1930s French-language films
Films directed by Pierre Caron
Films directed by Léonce Perret
Operetta films
Remakes of German films
Pathé films
French musical comedy films
French black-and-white films
1930s French films